Atlantic Soccer Conference (ASC) was a college athletic conference which only sponsored men's soccer. The conference participated in the NCAA's Division I and its champion did not receive an automatic bid to the annual NCAA Men's Soccer Championship Tournament. It was founded in 2000 with nine colleges and universities as its members but disbanded following the 2011 season when its membership dwindled to three members.

Membership

Conference champions

References

 
Defunct NCAA Division I conferences
2000 establishments in Pennsylvania
2011 disestablishments in Pennsylvania
Sports leagues established in 2000
Sports leagues disestablished in 2011